Michaella Gina Russell (born 16 April 1992), is a South African actress. She is best known for her role 'Charlie Holmes' in the popular television soap opera Isidingo.

Early life
Russell was born on 16 April 1992 in South Africa. Her father was a fighter-jet pilot who survived a plane crash but was left with a spinal fracture and memory loss due to brain damage. She has one sister. Her uncle is a jazz guitarist. She studied a double major in Neuropsychology and Economics. She suffered from an eating disorder from the age of 15 until she was 22.

Career
Russell's first theater performance was at the age of eight or nine.

In 2013, she joined the cast of popular South African soapie Isidingo where she played the supportive role 'Charlie Holmes'. In 2016, she became a television presenter of the television program Funatix. In 2017, she starred in the American feature film Next Assignment Code Blue.

Filmography

References

External links
 

Living people
South African television actresses
South African film actresses
1992 births